Surekha may refer to:

 Surekha (artist), Indian video artist
 Surekha (actress), Indian film and television actress